The third Minnesota Legislature first convened on January 8, 1861. The 21 members of the Minnesota Senate and the 42 members of the Minnesota House of Representatives were elected during the General Election of November 6, 1860.

Sessions 
The legislature met in a regular session from January 8, 1861 to March 8, 1861. There were no special sessions of the third legislature.

Party summary 
Resignations and new members are discussed in the "Membership changes" section, below.

Senate

House of Representatives

Leadership

Senate 
Lieutenant Governor
Ignatius L. Donnelly (R-Nininger)

House of Representatives 
Speaker of the House
Jared Benson (R-Anoka)

Members

Senate

House of Representatives

Membership changes

Senate

House of Representatives

Notes

References 

 Minnesota Legislators Past & Present - Session Search Results (Session 3, Senate)
 Minnesota Legislators Past & Present - Session Search Results (Session 3, House)

03rd
1860s in Minnesota